Colette Deréal (born Colette Denise de Glarélial; 22 September 1927 – 12 April 1988) was a French actress and singer.

Eurovision Song Contest 1961
Deréal was born in Saint-Cyr-l'École, Seine-et-Oise (now Yvelines), France. In 1961, Deréal represented Monaco in the Eurovision Song Contest 1961, with the song "Allons, allons les enfants" (Let's go, let's go children). Deréal finished joint tenth place with the Finnish entry "Valoa ikkunassa" (The lights in the window) sung by Laila Kinnunen and the Dutch entry "Wat een dag" (What a day) sung by Greetje Kauffeld, receiving six points. She died in Monaco.

Selected filmography
 Boîte à vendre (1951)
 The Convict (1951)
 This Age Without Pity (1952)
 Sergil Amongst the Girls (1952)
 This Man Is Dangerous (1953)
 Yours Truly, Blake (1954)
 The Red Cloak (1955)
 Three Sailors (1957)
 Under the Sign of the Bull (1969)

External links

1927 births
1988 deaths
People from Saint-Cyr-l'École
Eurovision Song Contest entrants for Monaco
Eurovision Song Contest entrants of 1961
20th-century French women singers